The Opener BlackFly is an American electric-powered VTOL personal air vehicle designed by Canadian engineer Marcus Leng. It was publicly revealed in 2018, after nine years of development. The aircraft is intended to be supplied complete and ready-to-fly and Opener are in the process of starting production at their Palo Alto, California site.

The manufacturer claims that the design is the world's first ultralight fixed-wing, all-electric, vertical take-off and landing aircraft. Investors in the company include Google co-founder Larry Page.

Development
The first proof-of-concept version was flown on 5 October 2011, in Warkworth, Ontario, Canada, by Leng. He flew the next model, named the BlackFly, in August 2014 and then relocated the company to Palo Alto, California in September 2014. In February 2016, the second BlackFly prototype was first flown. By September 2017, the prototype had flown  in a series of flights of at least  each. The first pre-production aircraft was flown in October 2017.

The design is intended for the FAR 103 Ultralight Vehicles category in the United States and the Basic Ultralight Aeroplane category in Canada. The United States version and international versions will have different ranges, speeds and weights to comply with national regulations.

In discussing the design in person with Leng at AirVenture in July 2018, AVweb reviewer Paul Bertorelli indicated that it is "a terrific idea and I'm betting the concept itself has legs, whether Opener's version fails to gain a market or not", but expressed concern about the lack of pricing and "cost/value relationship" marketing overreach. However he did indicate that "It's early in their game and they have a long developmental road ahead before selling these things." Bertorelli also expressed concern that the company did not allow journalists access to look over the aircraft and would not answer any technical questions.

The new CEO of Opener, Ben Diachun stated in January 2020 that the BlackFly was close to being ready for manufacturing and sales.

The aircraft was flown with crew in demonstrations at AirVenture 2021 and was noted as the first aircraft in its category to do so. It was also reported by the company to be in full production in July 2021, although no price had been publicly announced.

Design
The aircraft is made from carbon-fiber reinforced epoxy with all-electric battery-powered propulsion. It has two  cantilevered tandem wings, on the front and rear of a short fuselage. The fuselage has a single-seat cockpit under a bubble canopy. The forward wing is low, and the rear wing high, giving the cockpit good forward visibility. Each wing has four tractor configuration contrarotating propellers powered by electric motors. The tractor configuration prevents the flexible propellers from contacting the airframe. Each wingtip has winglets to improve lateral stability and reduce vortex drag. The aircraft weighs  empty and can carry a pilot and baggage totaling . A ballistic parachute is optional.

The aircraft is not a tiltwing or tiltrotor design, instead, the entire aircraft changes pitch. When the aircraft is parked, both wings and their motors are canted up at about 45 degrees. To ascend vertically, the aircraft pitches up 45 degrees, so that the propellers pull vertically. The wing-mounted tractor propellers move air over the wings, reducing stall speeds. So, at pitch angles near zero degrees, the aircraft can fly slowly with high angles of attack. For efficient horizontal flight, the aircraft pitches down 45 degrees, canting the wings and propellers to an optimal angle of attack. The forward wing has a slightly lower angle of attack to aid stall recovery. At low speeds the forward wing will stall first, causing the nose to fall, increasing air speed and exiting a stall.

The take-off and landing distances are 36 inches. The landing gear consists of a rub-strip on the bottom of an amphibious hull and a small rubber bumper on the rear of the fuselage. The lower edge of the winglets are skids that limit the vehicle's roll when parked. The vehicle is designed to fly from a grass surface, but can also be flown from fresh water, asphalt, snow and ice.

Pilot controls are a joystick with a thumb control for altitude. Flight controls are triple-redundant fly-by-wire controlling the motors and dual elevons on the outer edge of both wings. Differential motor speeds provide control authority in pitch, roll and yaw. Elevons also permit control in an efficient unpowered glide mode. The elevons are in the prop-wash of the outer propellers, enhancing their roll and pitch authority at low speeds. Flight stability is software-controlled, with modes for cruise-control, "return-home," auto-land and geo-fencing.

Most flight testing was unmanned, operated by software with a test weight in place of a pilot. Each motor weighs  and produces  of thrust. There are two batteries per motor, located in the wing, behind each motor. Adjacent batteries can be cross-connected for redundancy. The batteries are software-monitored.

Specifications (BlackFly International)

See also
List of electric aircraft

References

External links

AVweb interview at Oshkosh AirVenture 2018
 
AVweb interview at Oshkosh AirVenture 2019

Opener aircraft
2010s United States sport aircraft
2010s United States ultralight aircraft
Electric aircraft
Mid-wing aircraft
Canard aircraft
Aircraft first flown in 2017
VTOL aircraft